Tareck Raffoul (June 20, 1989) is a Lebanese filmmaker, photographer, creative director, and content creator; he is based between Paris and Dubai. Raffoul received his bachelor's degree in audio-visual arts from the American University of Technology in Lebanon; he then obtained a scholarship for a master's degree in Filmmaking with a focus on Documentaries from Erasmus Mundus Docnomads program. and studied in Portugal's Universidade Lusófona de Lisboa, Színház- és Filmművészeti Egyetem in Hungary and in Belgium at the LUCA School of Arts.

Raffoul directed short films one of which is the decorated "Piros Fehér Zöld" (Red white green in English). The movie recounts the story of Anna, a mother who struggles to care for Laczi, her 37-year-old down syndrome child. "Piros Feher Zold" was selected in different film festivals between 2014 and 2015 such as Belgrade Documentary and Short Film Festival, Mediawave International Film Festival, International Student Film Festival (Winner best short documentary), Scottish Mental Health Arts and Film Festival (Winner best short documentary), NDU International Film Festival (Special jury mention award), Original Narrative: Student Short Film Festival Dubai (People choice award and the Best documentary award), Festival Nacional de Cine Estudiantil Fenacies Uruguay (Winner best international short documentary).

In 2015 Raffoul was selected as one of the rising talents in cinematography in Talents Beirut under Berlinale talents campus (Berlin International Film Festival).
In 2016 he moved to Dubai where he worked as a content creator and head of content for agencies and production houses until he started freelancing as a photographer and filmmaking in 2018.
In 2018 Tareck got selected by Starch Foundation where he exhibited two photography series "Ashes to Nature" April 2018 and "Leaving Home" November 2018. In April 2019 he did his 1st solo exhibition in Belgrade, Serbia under Belgrade photo month.

Filmography

References

1989 births
Lebanese film directors
Artists from Beirut
Living people
Lebanese photographers